MVP: Most Valuable Primate is a 2000 feature film that sparked the MVP trilogy. The film's title character, Jack, is a chimpanzee who plays hockey.

Plot
The plot revolves around an ape playing sports. Jack, a three-year-old chimpanzee, is the subject of an experiment involving sign language performed by Dr. Kendall at San Pueblo University in San Diego, California.  However, Dr. Kendall loses funding for his research. Kendall arranges for Jack to return to his original home in a California nature preserve, but dies before the transaction is completed and Kendall's boss, Dr. Peabody, sells Jack to the University of Tennessee. Meanwhile, the Westover family has just moved to Nelson, British Columbia. Steven, the son, was the leading scorer on his high school hockey team in California and joins the local junior B team, the Nuggets; he is surprised, however, by the violence of the play and the apathy of his teammates to their constant losing. His sister, Tara, who is deaf, is having a hard time making friends at her new school.

Meanwhile, hearing rumours that the University of Tennessee is performing hepatitis tests on primates, a maintenance worker at San Pueblo Jack's arranges for Jack to return to the nature preserve as originally planned; however, Jack falls asleep on the train and ends up in Nelson instead. Jack finds shelter in Tara's tree house but ends up surprising Tara when she enters, causing her to faint; when Tara wakes up she learns he can use sign language. She attempts to hide Jack from her parents and Steven but is unsuccessful. Steven soon discovers that Jack has an uncanny ability to play the sport of ice hockey and Jack joins Steven on the Nuggets after the coach convinces the league's owners that a chimpanzee player would bring in a massive increase in ticket sales. Jack instantly brings the Nuggets on-ice success and also helps Tara to become closer to her classmates.

Eventually, the Nuggets become the champions of junior B, qualifying for the Harvest Cup final in Vancouver. During the game, Peabody appears at the arena, demanding to take Jack from the team; the team refuses to give him up, so Peabody makes a plan to take him after the game. Tara is able to figure out Peabody's plan, and alerts Steven and the team; Steven takes Jack away from the arena during the second intermission in order to send him home to the nature preserve, and Tara, being a similar size to Jack, puts on Jack's gear and jersey, ends up scoring the game-winning goal and stops Peabody from taking Jack, who makes his way to the preserve.

Cast
 Russell Ferrier as Darren
 Lomax Study as Dr. Kendall
 Kevin Zegers as Steven Westover
 Jamie Renée Smith as Tara Westover
 Alexa Fox as Jane
 Jane Sowerby as Julie Beston
 Ingrid Tesch as Susie Westover
 Philip Granger as Mark Westover
 Rick Ducommun as Coach Marlow
 Bernie, Mack, and Louie as Jack
 Oliver Muirhead as Dr. Peabody

Development
The film was originally produced by Keystone with Walt Disney Pictures, but Disney left the project after deeming the film as "strictly for the vid shelf".

Release
The film was released theatrically in the United States and Canada on October 20, 2000 by Keystone Releasing. It was released on VHS and DVD in the United States and Canada on January 23, 2001, by Warner Home Video. Some international rights were sold to Universal Studios Home Video and Buena Vista Home Entertainment.

Reception
The film received negative reviews.  On Rotten Tomatoes the film has an approval rating of 20% based on reviews from 5 critics.

Sequels
The film generated one theater-released sequel and one direct-to-video sequel. In each film, Jack learns to play a different sport. These are MVP 2: Most Vertical Primate (2001) and MXP: Most Xtreme Primate (2004). While MVP 2 gained a theaterical release as with its predecessor, MXP was released straight-to-video.

References

External links
 
 

Films about apes
2000s sports comedy films
Canadian ice hockey films
2000 films
American children's films
Films about animals playing sports
Films directed by Robert Vince
2000s English-language films
2000s children's films
American ice hockey films
American sports comedy films
Canadian sports comedy films
2000 directorial debut films
2000 comedy films
2000s American films
2000s Canadian films